Aglossa is a genus of small moths belonging to the family Pyralidae. It was described by Pierre André Latreille in 1796. They are found mainly in western Eurasia, though some species have been introduced elsewhere.

This genus is remarkable for the caterpillars, which in some species are able to feed on a wide range of materials that are not usually eaten by Lepidoptera larvae, such as dead insects, manure and straw. The caterpillars of other Aglossa (e.g. A. signicostalis) are myrmecophilous.

Adults of the grease moth (A. cuprina) sometimes eat fats such as suet.

Species
 Aglossa acallalis Dyar, 1908
 Aglossa aglossalis
 Aglossa asiatica
 Aglossa aurocupralis
 Aglossa baba Dyar, 1914
 Aglossa brabanti Ragonot, 1884
 Aglossa cacamica (Dyar, 1913)
 Aglossa caprealis (Hübner, [1809]) – stored grain moth
 Aglossa capsalis
 Aglossa costiferalis (Walker, 1886)
 Aglossa cuprina (Zeller, 1872) – grease moth
 Aglossa dimidiatus (Haworth, 1809)
 Aglossa disciferalis (Dyar, 1908)
 Aglossa electalis Hulst, 1866
 Aglossa exsucealis
 Aglossa fumifusalis Hampson, 1916
 Aglossa furva Heinrich, 1931
 Aglossa gigantalis Barnes & Benjamin, 1925
 Aglossa gracilalis 
 Aglossa humberti (Viette, 1973)
 Aglossa inconspicua Butler, 1875
 Aglossa incultalis Zeller, 1852
 Aglossa infuscalis Hampson, 1906
 Aglossa micalialis
 Aglossa mineti Leraut, 2006
 Aglossa obliteralis
 Aglossa ocellalis
 Aglossa oculalis Hampson, 1906
 Aglossa phaealis Hampson, 1906
 Aglossa pinguinalis (Linnaeus, 1758) – large tabby moth
 Aglossa pulveralis
 Aglossa rabatalis
 Aglossa republicana Kemal, Kızıldağ & Koçak, 2020
 Aglossa rhodalis Hampson, 1906
 Aglossa rubralis Hampson, 1900
 Aglossa signicostalis Staudinger, 1871
 Aglossa steralis Felder & Rogenhofer, 1875
 Aglossa subpurpuralis
 Aglossa suppunctalis
 Aglossa tanya
 Aglossa tenebrosalis Rothschild, 1915
 Aglossa thamii
 Aglossa tinealis

Footnotes

References

 Grabe, Albert (1942): Eigenartige Geschmacksrichtungen bei Kleinschmetterlingsraupen ["Strange tastes among micromoth caterpillars"]. Zeitschrift des Wiener Entomologen-Vereins 27: 105-109 [in German]. PDF fulltext
 

Pyralini
Pyralidae genera